Hanam Geomdansan Station is a subway station on the Hanam Line of Seoul Subway Line 5 in Hanam-si, Gyeonggi-do.

Station layout

References 

Seoul Metropolitan Subway stations
Metro stations in Hanam
Seoul Subway Line 5
Railway stations in South Korea opened in 2021